The Hollywood Post Alliance Award for Outstanding Color Grading in a Feature Film is an annual award, given by the Hollywood Post Alliance, or HPA, to post production workers in the film and television industry, in this case color graders. It was first awarded in 2006, and has been presented every year since. From 2006 to 2011, the category was titled Hollywood Post Alliance Award for Outstanding Color Grading Feature Film in a DI Process. The "DI" in the title refers to a Digital intermediate, a motion picture finishing process which a motion picture is digitized and the color and other image characteristics manipulated. As the filmmaking has evolved more into a digital forum, the added "DI Process" of the title became, essentially, antiquated.

Winners and nominees

2000s
Outstanding Color Grading Feature Film in a DI Process

2010s

Outstanding Color Grading - Feature Film

References

Lists of films by award